The 35th parallel south is a circle of latitude that is 35 degrees south of the Earth's equatorial plane. It crosses the Atlantic Ocean, the Indian Ocean, Australasia, the Pacific Ocean and South America.

At this latitude the sun is visible for 14 hours, 31 minutes during the December solstice and 9 hours, 48 minutes during the June solstice.

This parallel is sometimes used to define the southern boundary of the subtropics.

Around the world
Starting at the Prime Meridian and heading eastwards, the parallel 35° south passes through:

{| class="wikitable plainrowheaders"
! scope="col" width="125" | Co-ordinates
! scope="col" | Country, territory or ocean
! scope="col" | Notes
|-
| style="background:#b0e0e6;" | 
! scope="row" style="background:#b0e0e6;" | Atlantic Ocean
| style="background:#b0e0e6;" |
|-
| style="background:#b0e0e6;" | 
! scope="row" style="background:#b0e0e6;" | Indian Ocean
| style="background:#b0e0e6;" | Passing just south of Cape Agulhas, 
|-
| 
! scope="row" | 
| Western Australia - passing through the northern suburbs of Albany and just south of Denmark and Walpole
|-
| style="background:#b0e0e6;" | 
! scope="row" style="background:#b0e0e6;" | Indian Ocean
| style="background:#b0e0e6;" |
|-
| 
! scope="row" | 
| South Australia - Eyre Peninsula and Thistle Island
|-
| style="background:#b0e0e6;" | 
! scope="row" style="background:#b0e0e6;" | Indian Ocean
| style="background:#b0e0e6;" | Spencer Gulf
|-
| 
! scope="row" | 
| South Australia - Yorke Peninsula
|-
| style="background:#b0e0e6;" | 
! scope="row" style="background:#b0e0e6;" | Indian Ocean
| style="background:#b0e0e6;" | Gulf St Vincent
|-valign="top"
| 
! scope="row" | 
| South Australia - passing just south of Adelaide Victoria New South Wales Australian Capital Territory
|-
| style="background:#b0e0e6;" | 
! scope="row" style="background:#b0e0e6;" | Pacific Ocean
| style="background:#b0e0e6;" | Tasman Sea
|-
| 
! scope="row" | 
| North Island, just north of Ahipara Beach, crossing through Awanui, Whangaroa Harbour, Mangonui and Butlers Point Northland, the town of Kaitaia (pop around 5,000) is 7km south of it
|-
| style="background:#b0e0e6;" | 
! scope="row" style="background:#b0e0e6;" | Pacific Ocean
| style="background:#b0e0e6;" |
|-
| 
! scope="row" | 
| O'Higgins Region - passing just south of Curicó
|-
| 
! scope="row" | 
| The parallel defines the border between Córdoba Province and La Pampa ProvincePassing just south of La Plata
|-
| style="background:#b0e0e6;" | 
! scope="row" style="background:#b0e0e6;" | Atlantic Ocean
| style="background:#b0e0e6;" | Río de la Plata estuary - passing just south of Montevideo,  Passing between Punta del Este and Isla de Lobos, 
|}

See also
34th parallel south
36th parallel south

s35
Borders of Argentina